South Bruce is not to be confused with the Town of South Bruce Peninsula

South Bruce is a municipality in Bruce County, Ontario, Canada.

History
South Bruce was created in 1999 as part of county-wide municipal restructuring.  In 1998, the Township of Culross and the Village of Teeswater amalgamated to form the Township of Teeswater-Culross.  Similarly, the Village of Mildmay joined with the Township of Carrick to form the Township of Mildmay-Carrick.  The following year, both Mildmay-Carrick and Teeswater-Culross amalgamated again to form South Bruce, choosing Teeswater as the seat of the municipality.

Communities
The two main population centres in South Bruce are Mildmay and Teeswater. Other communities within the municipal boundaries are Carlsruhe, Deemerton, Formosa and Salem.

Demographics 

Population trend:
 Population in 2016: 5,639
 Population in 2011: 5,685
 Population in 2006: 5,939
 Population in 2001: 6,063
 Population total in 1996: 6,248
 Carrick (township): 2,431
 Culross (township): 1,638
 Mildmay (village): 1,110
 Teeswater (village): 1,069
 Population in 1991:
 Carrick (township): 2,378
 Culross (township): 1,636
 Mildmay (village): 1,095
 Teeswater (village): 1,066

See also
2018 Bruce County municipal elections
List of townships in Ontario

References

External links
 

Lower-tier municipalities in Ontario
Municipalities in Bruce County